The Medford Pipe Bridge is a historic plate girder pipeline bridge over the Mystic River, between S. Court St. and the Mystic Valley Parkway in Medford, Massachusetts. It was built in 1897 as part of the Metropolitan Water Board's northern high and low service.

The bridge carries a 20" high-service pipe and a 48" low-service pipe between the Chestnut Hill Reservoir and Spot Pond that are cross connected with the Mystic Water Works pumping station in Somerville. The bridge was built by the New Jersey Steel & Iron Company in Trenton, New Jersey, and placed on abutments designed by Cheney & Trumbull.  It also carries foot traffic.

The bridge was listed on the National Register of Historic Places  in 1990. A postcard ca. 1938 calls it the "Foot Bridge over Mystic River", Medford, Mass.

See also
List of bridges on the National Register of Historic Places in Massachusetts
National Register of Historic Places listings in Medford, Massachusetts
National Register of Historic Places listings in Middlesex County, Massachusetts

References

Mystic River
Bridges on the National Register of Historic Places in Massachusetts
Bridges in Middlesex County, Massachusetts
National Register of Historic Places in Medford, Massachusetts
Buildings and structures in Medford, Massachusetts
Bridges on the National Register of Historic Places
Water transportation buildings and structures on the National Register of Historic Places
Steel bridges in the United States
Plate girder bridges in the United States